ISIE may refer to:

 International Society for Industrial Ecology
 the Tunisian Independent High Authority for Elections